The House of Bardi was an influential Florentine family that started the powerful banking company Compagnia dei Bardi.
In the 14th century the Bardis lent Edward III of England 900,000 gold florins, a debt which he failed to repay along with 600,000 florins borrowed from the Peruzzi family, leading to the collapse of both families' banks. During the 15th century the Bardi family continued to operate in various European centres, playing a notable role in financing some of the early voyages of discovery to America including those by Christopher Columbus and John Cabot.

History 

The nobility of the Bardi family has been documented since the year 1164, when Emperor Friedrich Barbarossa relinquished the county of Vernio to Count Alberto along with "the right to confer the noble title on his descendents.". Countess Margherita, the last of Alberto's line, sold Vernio to her son-in-law, Piero de' Bardi. Alberto's property included "a castle and nine communes" located 22 miles from Florence on an area that bordered the Mugello. During the fourteenth century the Bardi family became so powerful that the Florentine government considered them a threat. They eventually were forced to sell their castle to Florence because "fortified castles near the city were seen as a danger to the republic.".

In the 1290s, the Bardi and Peruzzi families had established branches in England and were the main European bankers by the 1320s. By the fourteenth century the Bardi and the Peruzzi family grew tremendously wealthy by offering financial services. These two families facilitated trade by providing the merchants with bills of exchange, known today as checks. What made it so simple was that money paid by a debtor in one town could be paid out to creditor just by presenting the bill in another town.
By 1338, there were more than eighty banking houses in Florence. The Bardi family had thirteen different branches located in Barcelona, Seville and Majorca, in Paris, Avignon, Nice and Marseilles, in London, Bruges, Constantinople, Rhodes, Cyprus and Jerusalem. Some of Europe's most powerful rulers were indebted to the Bardi family. This was one of the main reasons of the bankers' downfall.

During the Hundred Years War in the early 1340s, Edward III of England was engaged in an expensive war with France. He borrowed 600,000 silver florins from the Peruzzi banking family and another 900,000 from the Bardi family. In 1345 Edward III defaulted on his payments, causing both banking families to go bankrupt.

Despite the failure of the bank, the Bardi family ranked among Italy's most successful merchants and continued to benefit from their noble status. Numerous family members occupied important positions such as crusaders and ambassadors to the Pope in Rome; some were even knights.  The marriage of Contessina de' Bardi to Cosimo de' Medici around 1415 was a key factor in establishing the House of Medici in power in Florence.  Cosimo rewarded the Bardi family for their support, restoring their political rights upon his ascent in 1434.  In 1444, he exempted them from paying particular taxes.

Besides banking, the Bardi family were "great patrons of the friars." Louise of Toulouse (1274–1297), the Franciscan bishop who was canonized in 1317, was very close to the Bardi family. They purchased the chapel that was dedicated to St. Francis. To the right of the altar they built a new, larger chapel and dedicated it to Louise of Toulouse. The Bardi chapel that was dedicated to St. Francis was founded by Ridolfo de Bardi around 1310, the year that his father died and left him with a large inheritance and in charge of the Bardi company. There were other Bardi chapels, such as the one dedicated to St. Lawrence and the Martyrs, and St. Silvestor and the Confessors.

Two important paintings, both called the Bardi Altarpiece, are by Sandro Botticelli (1484-85, now in Berlin), and by Parmigianino, the latter named after the town rather than the family.  One of the family palaces in Florence was the Palazzo Busini Bardi.

See also
 Gran Tavola
 Peruzzi
 Acciaioli family
 House of Medici
 Fugger family

References

Bibliography

Further reading

Families of Florence
Banking families
Bardi family
Italian noble families
Republic of Florence
Medieval economics
Economy of medieval England